Mallika Singh (born 15 September 2000) is an Indian television actress known for the portrayal of Devi Radha and Devi Lakshmi in RadhaKrishn and Jai Kanhaiya Lal Ki respectively.

Career 
In 2016, Singh appeared in Zee TV's Janbaaz Sindbad, where she played the role of Aameen.

From October 2018 to January 2023, she appeared in Star Bharat's RadhaKrishn where she played the lead role of Radha opposite Sumedh Mudgalkar. She also played several recurring characters including Sita, Lakshmi, Bhudevi, Ashtalakshmi, Shitala, Alakshmi, Vallabha, Vrindavaneshwari, Madhavi, and Kishori.

In October 2021, she reprised her role of Devi Lakshmi in RadhaKrishn's prequel series Jai Kanhaiya Lal Ki which also aired on Star  Bharat and Disney+ Hotstar ended in July 2022.

Filmography

Films

Television

Special appearances

Web series

Awards and nominations

References

External links 
 
 

Living people
2000 births
21st-century Indian actresses

Indian television actresses
Actresses in Hindi television
Indian soap opera actresses